Planta is a brand of margarine produced by Upfield for Belgium, France, Malaysia and Portugal. It is made from vegetable oil: rapeseed, maize and sunflower.

History
Planta was the first margarine to be imported into Malaysia in 1930. With an estimated market share of over 50% within Malaysia, it is now a widely used ingredient in a variety of local and Malaysian style cuisines such as Chicken Rice, Roti Canai (or roti planta), roadside burgers, local coffee and a large selection of cakes, pastries and desserts.

In August 1960, tens of thousands got sick and two people from the Netherlands died eating Planta-brand margarine, with the cause directed at the use of a new additive.

It was re-branded as Brio and later as Bertolli. The name Planta was kept in other markets. Planta and the rest of Unilever spreads brands were later divested and now known as Upfield.

See also

References

Former Unilever brands
Margarine brands
Upfield (company) brands